The 2017–18 American Eagles women's basketball team represents American University during the 2017–18 NCAA Division I women's basketball season. The Eagles, led by fifth year head coach Megan Gebbia, play their home games at Bender Arena and were members of the Patriot League. They finished the season 26–7, 16–2 in Patriot League play win the Patriot League regular season. They won the Patriot League women's tournament by defeating Navy and earns an automatic trip to the NCAA women's tournament where they lost to UCLA in the first round.

Previous season
They finished the season 15–16, 11–7 in Patriot League play to finish in a tie for fourth place. They advanced to the semifinals of the Patriot League women's tournament where they lost to Bucknell.

Roster

Schedule

|-
!colspan=9 style=| Non-conference regular season

|-
!colspan=9 style=| Patriot League regular season

|-
!colspan=9 style=| Patriot League Women's Tournament

|-
!colspan=9 style=| NCAA Women's Tournament

See also
 2017–18 American Eagles men's basketball team

References

American
American Eagles women's basketball seasons
American Eagles women's basketball
American Eagles women's basketball
American